Oddrúnargrátr (Oddrún's lament) or Oddrúnarkviða (Oddrún's poem) is an Eddic poem, found in the Codex Regius manuscript where it follows Guðrúnarkviða III and precedes Atlakviða.

The main content of the poem is the lament of Oddrún, sister of Atli, for Gunnarr, her lost and forbidden love. The poem is well preserved and thought to be a relatively late composition, perhaps from the 11th century. The metre is fornyrðislag.

External links
Oddrunargratr Translation and commentary by Henry A. Bellows
Oddrún’s Lament Translation by Benjamin Thorpe
Oddrúnargrátr Translation by William Morris and Eirikr Magnusson
Oddrúnargrátr Sophus Bugge's edition of the manuscript text
Oddrúnarkviða Guðni Jónsson's edition of the text with normalized spelling

11th-century poems
Eddic poetry
Sources of Norse mythology
Nibelung tradition